Heesch is a village in the Dutch province of North Brabant. Heesch is next to the village . It is located in the municipality of Bernheze, about 3 km south of Oss.  

Heesch was a separate municipality until 1994, when it merged with Heeswijk-Dinther and Nistelrode. The new municipality was originally called "Heesch", but changed its name to "Bernheze" in 1995.

References

External links

Municipalities of the Netherlands disestablished in 1995
Populated places in North Brabant
Former municipalities of North Brabant
Bernheze